Richard Alfred Eugen Jettel (20 March 1845 – 27 August 1901) was an Austrian painter, producing mainly landscapes. He studied at the Vienna Academy and moved to Paris in 1873, before moving back to Vienna in 1897 and serving as a co-founder of the Vienna Secession. He was made a Knight of the Légion d'honneur in 1898.

Life 
Jettel was the son of Sophie and Ladislaus Hugo Jettel, an ironworks-administrator. After his mother's death, the family moved to Vienna. His father died before he was 15.

In 1860, Jettel entered the class of Albert Zimmermann in the Academy of Fine Arts, Vienna, where he met Emil Jakob Schindler, Robert Russ and Rudolf Ribarz; there, he studied landscape painting and stayed until 1869. Study tours took him to France, the Netherlands, Istria and Hungary. In 1868 he became a member of the Vienna Künstlerhaus, and would exhibit several times there. While in Vienna, he came under August von Pettenkofen's influence. In 1872-73 he travelled around Italy with Leopold Carl Müller.

Jettel moved to Paris in 1873 to take up a well-paying job for the Austrian art dealer Charles Sedelmeyer, and led a successful artistic life there. Sedelmeyer may have hoped that Jettel would marry his daughter. However, instead, he married Cäcilie Mailer, the daughter of the owner of a glovemaker from Vienna. Sedelmeyer reduced his salary, and the couple found themselves in financial distress.

He had exhibitions in 1877–81 at the Salon des Champs-Elysées and in 1890–97 at the Salon du Champ-de-Mars, and he was nominated as a member of the 1889 Exposition Universelle jury. In 1898, he was made a Knight of the Légion d'honneur. He was at the centre of a circle of Austrian and German artists in Paris, but also had contact with French peers (including serving as a teacher to ) and ties to the Barbizon school.

An inheritance gave him the means to return to Vienna in 1897. He was a founding member of the Vienna Secession, sat on the Secession's working committee, and his work was shown at the group's fourth exhibition in 1899. Still successful artistically, he received patronage from Archduke Charles Stephen and his wife Archduchess Maria Theresia. In his last years, he visited Istria many times to paint landscapes.

Jettel died on 27 August 1901 in Lussingrande, before the start of an Adriatic study trip with the Archdruke. He was buried in the cemetery of Saint Anne in Trieste. In Ver Sacrum, the Secession named him "a great artist, a true friend and never to be forgotten."

His brother, Wladimir Eugen Eudard Jettel (1843-1910), was also a landscape painter; however, he was trained in Dresden.

Honours 

Gold Medal, 1st Class in Munich, 1874; for the pictures Forest Landscape and Hintersee.
Great Gold Medal in Vienna, 1877
Gold Medal in Paris, 1889
Gold Medal in Antwerp, 1893
Gold Medal in Chicago, 1893
First Class Medal in Antwerp, 1894 World Exhibition
Great Gold Medal in Dresden, 1897
Knight of the Légion d'honneur, 1898
Eugen-Jettel-Weg (Eugen Jettel Way) in Hietzing, named in his honour in 1932

Selected works 

Evening in the Harbour, 1882
From the Forest of Fontainbleau
Cottage Garden, 1892
Tree Landscape, about 1861
The Hintersee in Berchtesgaden, 1864
Ducks on the River, 1890
Riverbank in Hungary to 1871
High Mountain, about 1868
Dutch River Landscape, 1883
Dutch Landscape with Peasant Plowing, 1870
Motif at Szered in Hungary, 1871
Prater game with Bathers, 1869
Lakeshore, 1867
Hungarian Landscape, 1871
Torrent, 1860
Village Road in Brittany, 1895

References

External links

1845 births
1901 deaths
People from Rýmařov
People from the Margraviate of Moravia
Austrian painters
Austrian male painters
Members of the Vienna Secession
Landscape painters
Art Nouveau painters
Academy of Fine Arts Vienna alumni
Austrian expatriates in France
Chevaliers of the Légion d'honneur